Tony Peter Villiam Engman (born September 24, 1963, in Hallstavik, Norrtälje, Sweden) is a Swedish actor. He studied at Gothenburg Theatre Academy 1993–97.

Selected filmography
2000 - The Mind's Eye (TV series)
2001 - Sprängaren
2001 - A Song For Martin
2002 - Suxxess
2002 - Stora teatern (TV)
2004 - Min f.d. familj (TV)
2005 - Van Veeteren – Moreno och tystnaden
2005 - Storm
2006 - Wallander – Luftslottet
2006 - When Darkness Falls
2010 - Hotell Gyllene Knorren (TV (Julkalendern))
2010 - Himlen är oskyldigt blå

References

External links

People from Norrtälje
Swedish male actors
1963 births
Living people